Ivo Čarman (born 24 September 1959) is a Slovenian cross-country skier. He competed at the 1980 Winter Olympics and the 1984 Winter Olympics.

References

1959 births
Living people
Slovenian male cross-country skiers
Olympic cross-country skiers of Yugoslavia
Cross-country skiers at the 1980 Winter Olympics
Cross-country skiers at the 1984 Winter Olympics
Sportspeople from Kranj